Holdrege is a city in Phelps County, Nebraska, United States. The population was 5,495 at the 2010 census. It is the county seat of Phelps County. The Nebraska Prairie Museum is located in Holdrege.

History
Holdrege was established in 1883 when the railroad was extended to that point. It was named for George W. Holdrege, a railroad official. Holdrege was designated county seat in 1884.

Holdrege was settled primarily by immigrants from Sweden in the 1880s and was named after George W. Holdrege, general manager of the Chicago, Burlington, and Quincy Railroad Company. He constructed most of the line's mileage in Nebraska, including a section through this small settlement in Phelps County. On December 10, 1883, the first train arrived in Holdrege, a little pioneer town inhabited by 200 people.

In 1884, a campaign was started to move the county seat from Phelps Center to Holdrege, and an election was scheduled for October. By that time, the town had acquired a block of ground on which to erect a courthouse. With calm assurance of victory at the polls, Holdrege laid the cornerstone of the building intended to be the Phelps County Courthouse. At the special election, Holdrege received a majority of the votes but the legality of the election was questioned. So citizens of Holdrege went to Phelps Center, picked up the official records and books and hid them for two months pending the arrival of new county officials who would take over on January 1, 1885. Holdrege succeeded in becoming the county seat and the courthouse was completed.

Holdrege was incorporated on February 14, 1884, and quickly became the metropolis of the county, being well located with good roads from all directions. The early history of the town was one of ups and downs—good crops one year then drought and no crops at all for several years. In 1910, C. W. McConaughy, a Holdrege grain dealer, began crusading for use of the Platte River to supplement subsoil moisture for farmlands in the area. His dream became reality when Central Nebraska Public Power and Irrigation District began its power production and irrigation operations and water flowed into Phelps County for irrigation in 1941.

A large increase in the population of Holdrege in the immediate post-war years was due mostly to irrigation. With irrigation came both stable and increased crop production, which brought a pipeline company, grain elevators, and agriculture-related businesses to town. The city was declared a first-class city on May 4, 1967.

Geography

Climate

Demographics

2010 census
As of the census of 2010, there were 5,495 people, 2,351 households, and 1,496 families living in the city. The racial makeup of the city was 96.7% White, 0.1% African American, 0.4% Native American, 0.2% Asian, 1.5% from other races, and 1.0% from two or more races. Hispanic or Latino of any race were 4.7% of the population.

There were 2,351 households, of which 28.6% had children under the age of 18 living with them, 52.1% were married couples living together, 7.8% had a female householder with no husband present, 3.7% had a male householder with no wife present, and 36.4% were non-families. 32.4% of all households were made up of individuals, and 14.7% had someone living alone who was 65 years of age or older. The average household size was 2.27 and the average family size was 2.87.

The median age in the city was 42.4 years. 23.8% of residents were under the age of 18; 6.7% were between the ages of 18 and 24; 22.3% were from 25 to 44; 28% were from 45 to 64; and 19.3% were 65 years of age or older. The gender makeup of the city was 48.5% male and 51.5% female.

2000 census
As of the census of 2000, there were 5,636 people, 2,355 households, and 1,544 families living in the city. The population density was 1,498.5 people per square mile (578.7/km2). There were 2,602 housing units at an average density of 691.8 per square mile (267.2/km2). The racial makeup of the city was 97.29% White, 0.14% African American, 0.34% Native American, 0.25% Asian, 1.03% from other races, and 0.96% from two or more races. Hispanic or Latino of any race were 3.11% of the population.

There were 2,355 households, out of which 30.7% had children under the age of 18 living with them, 56.3% were married couples living together, 7.1% had a female householder with no husband present, and 34.4% were non-families. 30.4% of all households were made up of individuals, and 14.8% had someone living alone who was 65 years of age or older. The average household size was 2.35 and the average family size was 2.93.

In the city, the population was spread out, with 25.5% under the age of 18, 6.2% from 18 to 24, 25.6% from 25 to 44, 23.9% from 45 to 64, and 18.8% who were 65 years of age or older. The median age was 40 years. For every 100 females, there were 92.4 males. For every 100 females age 18 and over, there were 87.2 males.

As of 2000 the median income for a household in the city was $36,225, and the median income for a family was $44,939. Males had a median income of $29,288 versus $22,281 for females. The per capita income for the city was $20,569. About 5.7% of families and 8.8% of the population were below the poverty line, including 11.5% of those under age 18 and 7.5% of those age 65 or over.

Attractions
Holdrege is home of the Nebraska Prairie Museum.

Infrastructure

Transportation

US 183 passes south to north through the city, while US 6/34 traverses it west to east. A bus system is operated by the Phelps County Senior Center. Amtrak, the national passenger rail system, provides daily service through Holdrege, operating its California Zephyr daily in both directions between Chicago and Emeryville, California, across the bay from San Francisco.

Notable people
Tom Carlson, member of the Nebraska Legislature
 Mark R. Christensen, member of the Nebraska Legislature
 Ralph D. Cornell,  landscape architect
 Barbara Granlund, member of the Washington House of Representatives and Washington State Senate
 Jerry Johnson, member of the Nebraska Legislature
 DiAnna Schimek, member of the Nebraska Legislature
 Harry Schmidt, U.S. Marine Corps general, commanding general during the Mariana Islands Campaign

References

External links

Cities in Nebraska
Cities in Phelps County, Nebraska
County seats in Nebraska